Marlon Shaun Lewis (born 7 October 1987) is a South African rugby union player.

References

South African rugby union players
Living people
1987 births
Rugby union scrum-halves
Rugby union players from Port Elizabeth
Eastern Province Elephants players